Research vessels by country include:

Argentina

Australia 
 RSV Nuyina
 RSV 
 RV Franklin
 RV Investigator
 MV Nella Dan
 RV Southern Surveyor
 RV Solander
 RV Cape Ferguson

Bangladesh 

 RV Meen Shandhani
CVASU Research Vessel

Belgium 
 RV Belgica  (retired)
 RV Zeeleeuw
 RV Simon Stevin

Bermuda
RV Atlantic Explorer

Brazil
RV Professor W. Besnard (1967-2008)
 RV Atlântico Sul (1973-)
RV Alpha Crucis (2012-)
 BNS H21 Sirius
 BNS H35 Amorim do Valle
 BNS H36 Taurus
 BNS H37 Garnier Sampaio
 BNS H38 Cruzeiro do Sul
 BNS H40 Antares

Canada 
 
 
 
 
 
 
 
 
 
 
 
 
 Coriolis II

Chile 
 Cabo de Hornos AGS 61

China 
 Xuě Lóng
 Type 625 research vessel

Colombia 
 ARC Providencia
 ARC Malpelo
 ARC Quindio
 B/I Ancón

Denmark 
See also List of Danish research ships, which includes ships used only for expeditions
 Aurora (2014–present)
 Biologen (1932-1964)
 Dana I (1920-1922)
 Dana II (1921-1935)
 Dana III (1937-1980)
 Dana IV (1981–present)
 Sallingsund 1899-1932)
 Thor (1902-1919)

In addition to Danish research ships, Faroe Islands (self-governing part of the Kingdom of Denmark) operate their own:
 R/V Jákup Sverri (2020–present)

In addition to Danish research ships, Greenland (self-governing part of the Kingdom of Denmark) operate their own:
 R/V Sanna (2012–present)
 M/V Tarajoq (2021–present)

Finland  
 Aranda (1953-1989)
 Aranda (1989–present)
 Muikku
 Aurelia
 Seili I
 Seili II
 Geomari
 Kaiku
 Saduria

France 

  (1965-) 
 RV Côte d'Aquitaine
 RV Côtes de la Manche
 RV Gwen-Drez
 RV Atalante
 RV Europe
 RV Curieuse
 RV Suroît
 RV 
 RV 
 RV 
 RV Thalia
 RV Thethys II

Germany 

 Planet
 FRV Atair
 FRV Capella
 FRV Clupea
 FRV Deneb
 FRV Komet
 FRV Planet
 FRV Solea
 FRV Walther Herwig III
 FRV Wega
 RV Alexander von Humboldt (replaced by Maria S. Merian)
 RV Alkor
 
 RV Elisabeth Mann Borgese (ex FGS Schwedeneck)
 RV Haithabu
 RV Littorina
 RV Ludwig Prandtl
 
 RV Meteor (1915)
 RV Meteor (1964)
 RV Meteor (1986)
 RV Mya (replaced by Mya II)
 
 RV Poseidon
 RV Senckenberg
 
 
 RV Valdivia

Greece
 RV Aegaeo
 RV Philia

Iceland 
 RV Árni Friðriksson
 RV Bjarni Sæmundsson

India

Iran

Iranian National Institute for Oceanography and Atmospheric Science
 INIOAS Khalije Fars sea explorer

Ireland 
 
 RV Celtic Explorer
 RV Celtic Voyager
 RV Keary
 RV Geo
 RV Tonn
 M.V. Cosantóir Bradán
 RV Tom Crean

Italy 
 RV Andrea
 RV Astrea
 RV Cerruti
 RV Dallaporta
 RV Furetto
 RV Italica
 RV Luigi Sanzo
 RV Maria Grazia
 RV Minerva Uno
 RV OGS Explora
 RV Regione Lazio 1
 RV Tecnopesca II
 RV Trer
 RV Andromeda
 RV Futura

Italian Navy

 RV Alliance A 5345 (NATO vessel, since 1 January 2016 under Italian Navy flag)
 RV Leonardo A 5301 (NATO vessel, since 11 May 2007 under Italian government flag and since 14 May 2010 under Italian Navy flag)
 RV Ammiraglio Magnaghi A 5303
 RV Aretusa A 5304
 RV Elettra A 5340
 RV Galatea A 5308
 RV Vincenzo Martellotta A 5320
 RV Raffaele Rossetti A 5315

Japan 
 RV Chikyuu
 RV Hakurei Maru
 RV Hakuho Maru
 RV Kairei
 RV Kaiyo
  (formerly, Mutsu)
 RV Natsushima
 RV Shigen (formerly, RV Ramform Victory of Petroleum Geo-Services)
 RV Umitaka Maru
 RV Yokosuka
 RV Nisshin Maru
Japan Maritime Self-Defense Force operated vessels
 
 JS Suma (AGS-5103)
 JS Wakasa (AGS-5104)
 JS Nichinan (AGS-5105)
 JS Shonan (AGS-5106)

Lebanon 
 RV Cana cnrs

Mauritania 
 RV Almoravide
 RV N´diago
 RV Al Awam
 RV Amrigue

Netherlands 

 RV Tyro (1979-1993)
 
 RV Navicula
 RV Stern
 RV Tridens
 RV Isis
 HNLMS Snellius
 HNLMS Luymes

New Zealand 

  (1969-1991)
  (1975-1997)
  (1997-2012)
 HMNZS Takapu (A07) (1980-2000)
 HMNZS Tarapunga (A08) (1980-2000)
  (1991–present)
  (1941-1967)
  (1970-1997)

Norway 

 RV G.M. Dannevig
 RV Johan Hjort
 RV Helmer Hanssen (Jan Mayen)
 RV Håkon Mosby
 RV Dr Fridtjof Nansen
 RV Johan Ruud
 RV G.O. Sars
 RV Trygve Braarud
 RV Bjørn Føyn
 RV Lance

Pakistan 
 SV BEHR PAIMA

Peru

Philippines
 BRP Fort San Antonio (AM-700)
 BRP Fort Abad (AM-701)
 M/V DA BFAR
 BRP Gregorio Velasquez (AGR 702)

Poland 
 

 
 
 ORP Kopernik
 RV Baltica
 RV Doktor Lubecki
 RV IMOR
 RV Kaszubski Brzeg
 
 RV Oceanograf 1
 RV Oceanograf 2
 ORP Planeta (retired)
 ORP Zodiak (retired)
 RV Birkut (retired)
 RV Hydromet (retired)
 RV Pomorzanin (retired)
 RV Professor Bogucki (retired)
  (scrapped)
 RV Wieczno (retired)

Portugal

Portuguese Navy
 NRP Dom Carlos I
 NRP Almirante Gago Coutinho
 NRP Andrómeda
 NRP Auriga
 NRP Almeida Carvalho (1972-2002)

Portuguese Institute of the Sea and the Atmosphere
 NI Mar Portugal
 NI Noruega
 NI Diplodus
 NI Tellina (2003-2019)
 NI Capricórnio (1994-2008)

University of Azores
 NI Arquipélago

Romania 
 RV Mare Nigrum

Soviet Union/Russia 

 RV Aisberg-II (decommissioned)
 RV Akademik A. Karpinsky
 RV Akademik Aleksandr Nesmeyanov (decommissioned)
 RV Akademik Aleksandr Sidorenko (decommissioned)
 RV Akademik Boris Petrov
 RV Akademik Fersman
 RV 
 RV Akademik Ioffe

 RV Akademik Korolyov (decommissioned)
 RV Akademik Kovalevskiy (decommissioned)
 RV Akademik Kurchatov (decommissioned)
 RV Akademik Lazarev
 RV Akademik M.A.Lavrentyev
 RV 
 RV Akademik Nemchinov
 RV Akademik Nikolay Strakhov
 RV Akademik Oparin
 RV 
 RV Akademik Shatskiy
 RV 
 RV Akademik Vernadskiy(decommissioned)
 RV Akvanavt (decommissioned)
 RV Aleksei Chirikov (decommissioned)
 RV Alexey Maryshev
 RV Amur (decommissioned)
 RV Anatoliy Zhilinskiy
 RV Andrei Vilkitzky (decommissioned)
 RV Arktika (decommissioned)
 RV Artemida (decommissioned)
 RV Atlantida
 RV Atlantniro
 RV Atlas
 RV Atmosfera (decommissioned)

 RV Bar
 RV Belomor
 RV Boris Davidov (decommissioned)
 RV Briz (decommissioned)
 RV Buran (decommissioned)
 RV Dalniye Zelentsy
 RV Dmitriy Ovtsyn
 RV Dmitriy Mendeleev (decommissioned)
 RV Dmitry Peskov
 RV Eduard Tolly (decommissioned)
 RV Faddey Bellinsgausen (decommissioned)
 RV Fyodor Matisen (decommissioned)
 RV Fritiof Nansen
 RV Fyodor Litke (decommissioned)
 RV Gals (decommissioned)
 RV Gelendzhik
 RV Geo Arctic
 RV Geofizik
 RV Geolog Dmitriy Nalivkin

 RV Gidrobiolog
 RV Gidrolog (decommissioned)
 RV Gidrofizik (decommissioned)
 RV Gigrometr (decommissioned)
 RV Glubina (decommissioned)
 RV Grigoriy Mikheyev
 RV Groza (decommissioned)
 RV Ikhtiandr (decommissioned)
 RV Impuls (decommissioned)
 RV Iskatel-5
 RV Ivan Kireyev
 RV Ivan Kruzenshtern
 RV Ivan Petrov
 RV Jakov Smirnitskiy
 RV Kapitan Dranitsyn

 RV Kol'skaja
 RV Kompas (decommissioned)
 RV Leonid Morozov (decommissioned)
 RV Lugovoe (decommissioned)
 RV Mangazeya (decommissioned)
 RV Metan (decommissioned)
 RV Mikhail Verbitskiy
 RV Mikhail Lomonosov (decommissioned)
 RV Miklukho Maklay(decommissioned)
 RV Mirazh
 RV Murmanskaja (decommissioned)
 RV Nikolay Yevgenov (decommissioned)
 RV Okean (decommissioned)
 RV Odissey (decommissioned)
 RV Pamyat Merkuriya (decommissioned)
 RV Pavel Bashmakov (decommissioned)
 RV Pavel Gordienko
 RV Persey (operated between 1922 and 1941, the first Soviet research vessel)
 RV Pomor (decommissioned)
 RV Priboy
 RV Priliv (decommissioned)
 RV Professor Bogorov
 RV Professor Gagarinskiy
 RV Professor Kaganovskiy
 RV Professor Khromov
 RV Professor Kurentsov
 RV Professor Logachev
 RV  (decommissioned)
 RV Professor Multanovskyi
 RV Professor Polshkov
 RV Professor Rjabinkin
 RV Professor Vodyanitsky
 RV Professor Shtokman
 RV Professor Vladimir Kuztensov
 RV Professor Zubov (decommissioned)
 RV Petr Kottsov
 RV Rift
 RV Roumb (decommissioned)
 RV Semyon Dezhnev
 RV Sergey Kravkov
 RV Shelf (decommissioned)
 RV Smolensk (decommissioned)
 RV Taimyr
 RV Tantal (decommissioned)
 RV Tor
 RV Vadim Popov (decommissioned)
 RV Valentin Shashin (decommissioned)
 RV Valerian Uryvayev (decommissioned)
 RV Viktor Buynitskiy
  (III) (retired)
 RV Vityaz (IV) (decommissioned)
 RV Vladimir Sukhoskiyv
 RV Vsevolod Timonov (decommissioned)
 RV Vulkanolog Вулканолог (судно) (decommissioned)
 RV Vyacheslav Frolov

 RV Yakov Smirnitskiy
 RV Yantar (decommissioned)
 RV Yaroslavets (decommissioned)
 RV Yuzhmorgeologiya
 RV Zapolyarjye
 RV Zenit (decommissioned)

South Africa
 S.A. Agulhas
 S.A. Agulhas II

Spain

Armada Española
 BIO A-33 Hespérides

Consejo Superior de Investigaciones Científicas
 BO Sarmiento de Gamboa
 BO García del Cid
 BO Mytilus

Instituto Español de Oceanografía
 BIO Angeles Alvariño
 BIO Ramón Margalef

Secretaría General del Mar
 BIO Miguel Oliver
 BIO Intermares
 BIO Emma Bardán

Sweden 
 R/V Oscar von Sydow (1976–present)
 R/V Skagerak (1968) (1968–present)
 R/V Skagerak (2017) (2021–present)
 R/V Svea (2019–present)

Turkey

Taiwan (Republic of China)

Taiwan Ocean Research Institute
  (operated by National Taiwan University)
  (operated by National Taiwan Ocean University)
  (operated by National Sun Yat-sen University)

Republic of China Navy

Ukraine
 Borys Aleksandrov
 Noosfera

United Kingdom

Natural Environment Research Council
  Plymouth Marine Laboratory 
  Plymouth Marine Laboratory 
  Plymouth Marine Laboratory
  (Ocean Weather Ship)

National Oceanography Centre, Southampton
RRS Discovery (III), retired at the end of 2012 after 50 year's service.

British Antarctic Survey
  (retired)

Scottish Association for Marine Science

Newcastle University

University Marine Biological Station Millport
(London & Glasgow Universities)
 RV Aora, now University of Washington, USA

University of Wales
(Swansea)

Cardiff University

P&O Maritime
(Bangor University)

PEML, University of Liverpool
 
 RV Marisa of Liverpool

Marine Scotland

Centre for Environment, Fisheries and Aquaculture Science

Environment Agency
(National Marine Service)

Agri-Food and Biosciences Institute, Northern Ireland
  (replaced RV Lough Foyle)

Gardline Geoservices Ltd
 
 
 
 
 RV Ocean Researcher formerly

Others
 RDV 01 Crystal

United States

Florida Institute of Oceanography
 RV Bellows
 RV Suncoaster

Oregon State University

 R/V Taani, under construction
 R/V Pacific Storm
R/V Oceanus, formerly Woods Hole Oceanographic Institution
 R/V Elakha
 R/V Acona (retired)
 R/V Cayuse (retired)
 R/V Wecoma (retired)
 R/V Yaquina (retired)

Lamont–Doherty Earth Observatory
  (23 August - 5 October 1947)
  (1953-1981)
  (1962-1989)
  (1962-1974)
  (1988-2005)
  (2007-)

Marine Biological Laboratory
 RV Gemma

Monterey Bay Aquarium Research Institute
 
 
 
 R/V Rachel Carson, formerly

Moss Landing Marine Laboratories
 RV John H. Martin
 RV Point Sur
 RV Sheila B

National Oceanic and Atmospheric Administration

 NOAAS Bell M. Shimada
 NOAAS David Starr Jordan (Class IV)
 NOAAS Delaware II (Class IV)
 NOAAS Fairweather (Class II)
 (Class II)
 NOAAS Gordon Gunter (Class III)
 NOAAS Hi'ialakai (Class III)
 NOAAS Henry B. Bigelow (Class II)
 NOAAS Ka'imimoana (Class III)
 NOAAS Miller Freeman (Class II)
 NOAAS McArthur II (Class III)
  (Class III)
  (Class III)
 NOAAS Oregon II (Class III)
 NOAAS Oscar Dyson (Class II)
 NOAAS Oscar Elton Sette (Class III)
  (Class I)
  (Class II)
  (Class II)
http://www.moc.noaa.gov/flt_char.htm

Ocean Alliance
RV Odyssey

Schmidt Ocean Institute
 RV Falkor

Scripps Institution of Oceanography
 , better known as RV Argo (1960-1970)
  (1965-1992)
 , sold to the Philippines and now BRP Gregorio Velasquez
 
 RV New Horizon
 RV Robert Gordon Sproul

United States Antarctic Program

United States Environmental Protection Agency
 OSV Bold

United States Navy
 USNS Hayes
  (transferred to Mexican Navy in 2016)
  (retired from service in 2014)
  (operated by the University of Washington)
  (operated by the Woods Hole Oceanographic Institution)
  (operated by the Scripps Institution of Oceanography)
 RV Kilo Moana (operated by the University of Hawaii)
 RV Neil Armstrong (operated by the Woods Hole Oceanographic Institution)
 RV Sally Ride (operated by the Scripps Institution of Oceanography)
 USS San Carlos

Woods Hole Oceanographic Institution

  (1958-1977)
  (now used by the Hatfield Marine Science Center, Oregon State University, College of Earth, Ocean, and Atmospheric Sciences)
  (sold in 1996)
 
  (transferred to Mexican Navy in 2016)
  (Launched February 22, 2014. Now in service).

Others

 FWS Black Douglas
 RV Blue Heron (Large Lakes Observatory, University of Minnesota Duluth)
 SSV Corwith Cramer (Sea Education Association)
 RV Cape Hatteras (Marine Technology/Cape Fear Community College)
 RV Coral Reef II (John G. Shedd Aquarium)
  (URI)
  (University of Delaware Marine and Earth Studies, in service 2005)
 DV JOIDES Resolution
 SSV Robert C Seamans (Sea Education Association)
 RV Savannah (SkIO)
 RV Te Vega (Hopkins Marine Station)
  (University of Washington)
  (Occidental College)
 RV FG Walton Smith
 RV White Holly (White Holly Expeditions, LLC)
RV Zephyr  Outbound Marine Pacific Northwest (Private ownership, for hire)
  (LUMCON (Louisiana Universities Marine Consortium))
 RV Rachel Carson, University of Washington, formerly University Marine Biological Station Millport, UK

Vietnam
 HSV- 6613 Ocean surveillance ship (Giao su, Vien si Tran Dai Nghia)

Survey ships

Argentina

 ARA Comodoro Rivadavia (1974–present)
 ARA Cormorán
 ARA Puerto Deseado (1978–present)

Australia

  (1946-1964)
  (1943-1945)
  (1990–present)
  (1944)
  (1973-1998)
  (1959-1980)
  (1906-1914)
 HMAS Flinders (1981-1990)
  (1959-1966)
  (1956-1958)
  (1944-1956)
  (2000–present)
  (2000–present)
  (1989–present)
  (1933-1934, 1935-1946)
  (1964-1999)
  (1989–present)
  (1943-1946)
  (1990–present)
  (1952-1666)

Canada
 (1919-1923, 1925-1939, 1945-1969)
 (1919-1939)
 (1948-1958)

Chile
 AGS 61 Cabo de Hornos (2013)

France

 A758 Beautemps-Beaupré
 A791 Lapérouse
 A792 Borda
 A793 Laplace

Greece
 HS Naftilos (A-478)
 HS Pytheas (A-474)
 HS Strabon (A-476)

India
 INS Mesh (J34)
 INS Sandhayak (J18)
 INS Nirdeshak (J19)
 INS Nirupak (J14)
 INS Investigator (J15)
 INS Jamuna (J16)
 INS Sutlej (J17)
 INS Darshak (J20)
 INS Sarvekshak (J22)

Italy
 Aretusa A5304
 Galatea A5308
 Ammiraglio Magnaghi A5303

Japan
 AGS Shōnan
 AGS Nichinan
 AGS Suma
 AGS Futami

Netherlands
  (1929-1942)
  (1952-1972)
  (1952-1973)
  (10 November 1976 - 3 June 2004), sold and renamed Plancius in 2007
  (2003-)
  (2004-)

New Zealand
 SMB Adventure (1998–present)
 HMNZS Lachlan (F364) (1949–1975)
 HMNZS Manawanui (to be commissioned 2019)
  (1975–1997)
  (1997-2012)
  (1980–2000)
 RV Tangaroa (1991–present)
  (1980–2000)
  (1956–1967)
  (1970–1997)

Poland

Republic of Korea
 ROKS Sincheonji
 ROKS Sinsegi
 R/V ISABU

South Africa
 SAS Protea (A324)

Spain
 BIO Hespérides
 B/O Sarmiento de Gamboa
 B/O García del Cid
 A-23 Antares
 A-24 Rigel
 A-31 Malaspina
 A-32 Tofiño
 A-91 Astrolabio
 A-92 Escándalo

Taiwan (Republic of China)
 Ta Kuan

United Kingdom - Royal Navy

  (Antarctic)
 
  (Coastal)
  (Coastal)
  (Inshore)
  (Multi-Role Survey Vessel)
  (Multi-Role Survey Vessel)

Humber Sentinel

United States

 
 
 
 
  and 
 
 
 
 
 
 
 Other members of the US Navy fleet with "AGS" notation
  (1958-1971)

References 

Research Vessels